I'm Goin' Out Lika Soldier is the second solo studio album by American rapper Willie D. It was released on September 15, 1992, through Rap-A-Lot Records with distribution via Priority Records. Recording sessions took place at Track Design Studios and at Ultimate Sound Studios in Houston. Production was handled by Crazy C, Goldfingers, John Bido, Roland and Willie D.

The album peaked at number 88 on the Billboard 200 and at number 27 on the Top R&B/Hip-Hop Albums in the United States. Its lead single, "Clean Up Man", made it to #51 on the Hot R&B/Hip-Hop Songs and to #6 on the Hot Rap Songs.

Release
This album was released after a falling-out with the Geto Boys and refers to the incident on the album in the following lyric "I left Charlie Brown on the cut, 'cause I felt like Snoopy, workin for Peanuts", referring to his feeling of not being properly compensated for his work as an artist. This is a favorite of producer Blockhead.

Willie D debuted the album in August 1992 during an outdoor rally adjacent to the Houston Astrodome when the 1992 Republican National Convention was held where he did a sample of Rodney K.

Track listing

Notes
"Profile of a Criminal" and "Backstage" features vocals from Dave Summers
"Clean Up Man" features backing vocals from Jhiame and dialogue performed by DJ Blaster and Mona Lisa
"Campaign 92'" features vocals from Jay Lamonte
"U Still a Aggin" features backing vocals from K-Rino
Sample credits
"I'm Goin' Out Lika Soldier" contains elements from "Motor Booty Affair" by Parliament
"Pass da Piote'" contains elements from "Blues Dance Raid" by Steel Pulse
"Die" contains elements from "Good Old Music" by Funkadelic
"Clean Up Man" contains elements from "Clean Up Woman" by Betty Wright
"U Ain't No Ganksta" contains elements from "Gangster Boogie" by Chicago Gangsters and "The Big Gangster" by The O'Jays
"Rodney K." contains elements from "Mack's Stroll (The Getaway)" by Willie Hutch and "Give It Up or Turnit a Loose (Remix)" by James Brown
"U Still a Aggin" contains elements from "River Niger" by Sly Dunbar
"Little Hooker" contains elements from "Homie Don't Play That" by Geto Boys and "Givin' Up the Nappy Dugout" by Ice Cube
"Yo P My D" contains elements from "Material Girl" by Madonna and "It's a New Day" by James Brown
"What's Up Aggin" contains elements from "Homie Don't Play That" by Geto Boys
"My Alibi" contains elements from "Stop the Rain" by Average White Band

Personnel

William James Dennis – main artist, producer, arranger, executive producer
Dave Summers – featured artist (tracks: 1, 14)
Mark "Icy Hott" McCardell – featured artist (track 3)
Andre "Klondike Kat" Parish – featured artist (track 3)
Kerry "Rasir X" Wagner – featured artist (track 3)
Sho – featured artist (track 3)
Jhiame – backing vocals (track 5)
DJ Blaster – voice (track 5), scratches
Mona Lisa – voice (track 5)
Jay Lamonte – voice (track 9)
Eric "K-Rino" Kaiser – backing vocals (track 11)
Simon "Crazy C" Cullins – producer
Victor "Goldfingers" Diaz – producer
John Okuribido – producer
Roland Smith Jr. – producer
Bernie Bismark – engineering
Richard Simpson – engineering
Shetoro Henderson – engineering
Michael George Dean – mastering
Roger Tausz – mastering
Shawn Brauch – artwork
J. Patrick Smith – artwork
Pen & Pixel – design
Edward H. Strickland – concept

Charts

References

External links

1992 albums
Willie D albums
Rap-A-Lot Records albums